Fugitive in Trieste is a 1951 Italian war-drama film directed by Guido Salvini and starring Doris Duranti, Jacques Sernas and Massimo Girotti.

Plot
Giulio (Jacques Sernas), an Italian Air Force officer is arrested by Allied forces who believe he has deliberately bombed a hospital ship during World War II. Through the efforts of Lida (Doris Duranti), his sweetheart, a witness is found who proves the bombing was not intentional but the result of being hit by enemy fire.

Cast

 Doris Duranti as Lida
 Jacques Sernas as Giulio
 Massimo Girotti as Fred Nolan, Il falso giornalista
 Edda Albertini as Marcella
 Giovanni Grasso as  Ispettore di Polizia
 Cesare Polacco as Autista di taxi
 Carlo D'Angelo
 Charles Fawcett
 Vittorio Sanipoli
 Alberto Bonucci
 Giancarlo Sbragia
 Gianni Bonagura

Production
Fugitive in Trieste was one of a number of films of the era, including  the British productionSleeping Car to Trieste (1946) and American Diplomatic Courier (1952) that used Trieste as a backdrop. These films often highlighted its cosmopolitan nature and as a borderline between different powers due to the Trieste question.

References

Notes

Bibliography

External links
 

1951 films
Italian aviation films
1950s war drama films
Italian war drama films
1950s Italian-language films
Films set in Trieste
World War II aviation films
World War II war crimes trials films
1951 drama films
Italian black-and-white films
Italian World War II films
Films scored by Fiorenzo Carpi
1950s Italian films